Maisie Louise Collender Smith (born 9 July 2001) is an English actress and singer. She appeared in the feature film The Other Boleyn Girl (2008) and played the regular role of Tiffany Butcher in the BBC soap opera EastEnders from 2008 to 2014. In November 2016, Smith temporarily returned to EastEnders for a guest stint, before making a full-time return in January 2018. In October 2021 it was announced that she would once again be leaving EastEnders and her final scenes aired in December of that year; she made a one-off appearance in March 2022 to aid the departure of Keegan Baker (Zack Morris). In 2020, she competed in the eighteenth series of Strictly Come Dancing alongside partner Gorka Marquez, reaching the final but losing out to Bill Bailey.

Career
Smith attended the Singer Stage School in Leigh-on-Sea for 18 months, and in 2006, she was cast in the film The Other Boleyn Girl as a young Elizabeth I; the film was released in February 2008. She then went on to portray the role of Tiffany Dean in the BBC soap opera EastEnders. Smith made her first appearance on the soap on 1 April 2008, at age six, as the daughter of Bianca Jackson (Patsy Palmer). Her mother stated "The role is an exaggeration of her own personality, she's a little madam. A lively character both on and off screen. The difference is, she's told to pronounce her t's at home! She is not star-struck at all and has her feet very firmly on the ground. She is an extremely confident child and a great actress." Smith's father said, "She gets recognised quite a lot when we go out as a family. It's funny when you see people nudge each other and you can hear them saying, ‘Is that the girl off EastEnders?’"

A few months after her casting, Smith said that she was loving being on EastEnders, telling the Echo (Essex) "I love being on EastEnders. I really get on with Patsy who plays my mum. She looks after me so well. It's like I'm her real daughter some days. Everyone is really nice. Pam St Clement, who plays Pat Butcher, is also really lovely to me. I’m glad I get to be cheeky and say some funny lines. I would never want to be a goody goody. It's strange people point at me in the street now and ask if I’m the girl from EastEnders. All my friends think it's great I’m on television. I think I will want to be an actress forever now."

Digital Spy's Kris Green said Smith is "brilliant" and "one...to watch", comparing her to Ellis Hollins, the award-winning child actor who plays Tom Cunningham in the Channel 4 teen soap opera Hollyoaks. She has also been praised by stage school teacher Sandra Singer, who said, "Maisie has the most incredible memory and when it comes to script work she is fantastic. It is often very difficult for a six-year-old to act, but she handles it really well and adores it."

In 2010, Smith was asked to appear on CITV's Bookaboo, and read the story Stinky by Ian Whybrow. Smith told CITV "You have to be quiet in libraries which is really hard for me as I'm very loud. I would probably come last in a 'who can stay quiet the longest' competition!" In 2011, Smith was interviewed by The Stage magazine where she talked about her role in EastEnders. Smith said, "Sudden fame can be tricky when you are just out having fun and people keep wanting to take your photo, but the EastEnders people are very supportive and have said that we can politely say no in situations where we feel uncomfortable. I am very glad that my break came with EastEnders, as they are like a family who look after you. Working on the show has given me the chance to learn so much from the actors, especially those who are in my TV family. There are lots of things you can only learn from actually working on a set. The stage school I attend –also Singer Stage School – prepares you really well, but it is so different when you are actually there on set being filmed."

In October 2016, it was announced Smith would be releasing her first single, "Good Thing". Smith shot a music video accompanying the song at the Belt Craft studios and the song and video was uploaded to Smith's YouTube channel in November 2016. Smith released her second single, "Where My Heart Is", in March 2017. Smith said a lot of her songs were about herself, so she "wanted to write a song that inspired others" and she hopes "that got across" and that it "manages to inspire those who listen". On 3 November 2016, Smith made a previously unannounced temporary return to EastEnders. Smith returned full-time in January 2018.

In September 2020, it was announced that she would be competing in the eighteenth series of Strictly Come Dancing. She was partnered with Gorka Márquez. In December 2020, they finished in second place alongside Hrvy & Janette Manrara and Jamie Laing & Karen Hauer, after losing out to Bill Bailey and Oti Mabuse. 

In May 2022, it was announced Smith would be making her musical theatre debut in Strictly Ballroom: The Musical, playing Fran.

Smith was one of four finalists who completed series 4 of Celebrity SAS: Who Dares Wins.

Personal life
Smith lives in Westcliff-on-Sea, Essex, with her mother Julia, father Stephen and sister Scarlett. Smith attended Belfairs Academy in Leigh-on-Sea and the Sandra Singer Stage School. Smith attended South Essex College, where she studied musical theatre. , she was in a relationship with singer Max George.

Awards and nominations

Filmography

 Stage

 As herself

Discography

Extended plays

Music videos

References

External links
 
 
 

2001 births
Actresses from Essex
English child actresses
English child singers
English soap opera actresses
Living people
People from Westcliff-on-Sea
Singers from Essex
21st-century English women singers
21st-century English singers
21st-century English actresses